Khordha district (local language : ଖୋର୍ଦ୍ଧା ଜିଲ୍ଳା) is an administrative division of the state of Odisha, India. It was formed on April 1, 1993, by the division of former Puri District into Puri, Khordha and Nayagarh districts. In the year 2000 the district name was changed to Khordha. The district headquarters is Khordha Town. The capital city of Bhubaneswar is located in this district. Khordha is the most urbanized of all the districts of Odisha.

Khordha Road, the railway station that serves the town, is also the divisional headquarters of the East Coast Railway of the Indian Railways, and contains its own division. Khordha is known for its brass utensils, cottage industries, railway coach manufacturing and cable manufacturing unit and counsumer food manufacturing unit of various MNCs like Coca-cola,Pepsi,Uniliver,ITC etc.

History

It was the capital of Odisha from 1568 to 1803. It is also known for its fort, often described as the "last independent fort". The commander who kept it free from British East India Company was ), Bakshi Jagabandhu, popularly called 'Paika Bakshi'.

The Savaras tribal group, who are still to be found in the district in some pockets, once heavily populated the area. Khurda came into prominence when the first Rajas of the Khordha dynasty, Ramachandra Deva, made it the capital of his kingdom during the latter part of the 16th century. Khurda suffered repeated onslaughts from Muslim and Maratha cavalry but its royal house retained independence till 1804, when the British East India Company dispossessed Raja of his territory following the Second Anglo-Maratha War.

British government took Odisha under its rule in 1803 but could only include Khurda in 1827. The Paikas of Khurda are known for protesting against the British rule in Odisha.

Geography
The district is bordered by Cuttack district to the north and east, Puri district to the south, Ganjam district to the west, and Nayagarh district to the northwest. The Daya and Kuakhai Rivers flow through Khurda. The district is mainly flat coastal plain, with some hill ranges in the west. It borders the Chilika Lake.

Climate

 Temperature: 41.4 (max), 9.5 (min)
 Rainfall: 1443 mm (avg)

Economy
It is renowned for its brass utensils cottage industries, cable factory, spinning mills, watch repairing factory, railway coach repairing factory, oil industries, Coca-Cola bottling plant and small metal industries, or sms group, Iocl gas bottling plant.

Divisions
 Parliamentary constituencies: 2
 Assembly constituencies: 6
 Subdivisions: 2
 Villages: 1,561
 Blocks: 10
 Grama panchayat: 168
 Tehsils: 08
 Towns: 6
 Municipality: 2 (Khordha, Jatni)
 Municipal Corporation: 1 (Bhubaneshwar)
 N.A.C: 2 (Balugaon, Banpur)
Semi Urban town:1 (Tangi)

Tehsils
 Balianta
 Balipatna
 Banapur
 Begunia
 Bhubaneswar
 Bolagarh
 Chilika
 Jatni
 Khordha
 Tangi

Subdivisions
 Bhubaneswar: consists of 4 blocks, viz. Balianta, Balipatana, Jatni, Bhubaneswar.
 Khurda: consists of 6 blocks, viz. Tangi, Khorda sadara, Banapur, Begunia, Bolgarh and Chilika.

Demographics

According to the 2011 census Khordha district has a population of 2,251,673, roughly equal to the nation of Latvia or the US state of New Mexico. This gives it a ranking of 201st in India (out of a total of 640). Its population growth rate over the decade 2001-2011 was 19.65%. Khordha has a sex ratio of 925 females for every 1000 males, and a literacy rate of 87.51%. Scheduled Castes and Scheduled Tribes make up 13.21% and 5.11% of the population respectively.

At the time of the 2011 Census of India, 92.13% of the population in the district spoke Odia, 1.98% Urdu, 1.69% Telugu, 1.55% Hindi, 1.38% Bengali and 0.43% Santali as their first language.

Politics

Vidhan sabha constituencies

The following are the eight Vidhan sabha constituencies of Khordha district and the elected members of that area

Lok Sabha constituencies
During 1952 general election, Pandit Lingraj Mishra was elected from the Khurda (Lok Sabha constituency). 1957 onwards members were elected from Bhubaneswar (Lok Sabha constituency).

References

External links

 

 
Populated places established in 1993
1993 establishments in Orissa
Districts of Odisha